Boro Primorac (born 5 December 1954) is a Bosnian professional football manager and former player who most recently managed Croatian First Football League club Hajduk Split.

Playing career

Club
Primorac featured as a centre half with Yugoslavian clubs Velež Mostar and Hajduk Split, as well as for French teams Lille and Cannes.

International
Primorac played at the senior level for Yugoslavia whom he captained in the late 1970s. He made his debut for them in a February 1976 friendly match away against Tunisia and has earned a total of 14 caps, scoring no goals. Primorac went on to be triumphant as Yugoslavia won the gold medal in football at the 1979 Mediterranean Games. He also was a part of the Yugoslavian squad which got to the semi-finals of the 1980 Summer Olympics. All together Primorac was capped a sum of 18 times for Yugoslavia. His final international was a November 1980 World Cup qualification match against Italy.

Managerial career
After his playing days came to an end, Primorac went on to manage French clubs AS Cannes and Valenciennes.
He then worked under Frenchman Arsène Wenger at Grampus Eight in Japan before joining him at Highbury in March 1997. He then served under Wenger within the role of assistant coach at Arsenal.

On 4 November 2020, Primorac was appointed manager of Croatian club Hajduk Split. He was intended to be a caretaker, but after 7 points won in 3 matches he had extended the contract to the end of the year. After declining performances in December his contract was not extended again and he was replaced by Paolo Tramezzani in January 2021.

Managerial statistics

Personal life
Primorac is an ethnic Herzegovinian Croat. He is reportedly fluent in eight languages; his native Bosnian and Croatian, French, English, Japanese, German, Spanish, Portuguese and Italian. His son Jure Primorac is also a professional footballer.

Honours

Player

International
Yugoslavia
Mediterranean Games: 1979

References

External links

Profile at Yugoslavia / Serbia national team page
Profile Boro Primorac at Arsenal.com

1954 births
Living people
Sportspeople from Mostar
Croats of Bosnia and Herzegovina
Association football central defenders
Yugoslav footballers
Yugoslavia international footballers
Mediterranean Games gold medalists for Yugoslavia
Competitors at the 1979 Mediterranean Games
Mediterranean Games medalists in football
Footballers at the 1980 Summer Olympics
Olympic footballers of Yugoslavia
FK Velež Mostar players
HNK Hajduk Split players
Lille OSC players
AS Cannes players
Yugoslav First League players
Ligue 1 players
Ligue 2 players
Yugoslav expatriate footballers
Expatriate footballers in France
Yugoslav expatriate sportspeople in France
Yugoslav football managers
AS Cannes managers
Valenciennes FC managers
Yugoslav expatriate football managers
Expatriate football managers in France
Bosnia and Herzegovina football managers
Guinea national football team managers
HNK Hajduk Split managers
Bosnia and Herzegovina expatriate football managers
Expatriate football managers in Guinea
Bosnia and Herzegovina expatriate sportspeople in Japan
Bosnia and Herzegovina expatriate sportspeople in England
Bosnia and Herzegovina expatriate sportspeople in France
Expatriate football managers in Croatia
Bosnia and Herzegovina expatriate sportspeople in Croatia
Arsenal F.C. non-playing staff